This is a list of foreign players in the Australian A-League Women, which commenced play in 2008 as the W-League and was rebranded in 2021. The following players must meet both of the following two criteria:
Have played in at least one A-League Women game (including finals). Players who were signed by A-League Women clubs, but did not play in any competitive games, are not included.
Are considered foreign, i.e., outside Australia determined by the following:
A player is considered foreign if she is not eligible to play for the national team of Australia.
More specifically,
If a player has been capped on international level, the national team is used; if she has been capped by more than one country, the highest level (or the most recent) team is used. These include Australia players with dual citizenship.
If a player has not been capped on international level, her country of birth is used, except those who were born abroad from Australian parents or moved to Australia at a young age, and those who clearly indicated to have switched her nationality to another nation.

Clubs listed are those which have contracted the player. Note that calendar years are used. This follows general practice in expressing years a player spent at club.

As of November 2022, 36 different nations have been represented in the A-League Women. Philippines and Czech Republic are the most recent nations to be represented with Jaclyn Sawicki debuting for Western United and Jitka Chlastáková debuting for Western Sydney Wanderers on 26 November 2022.

In bold: players who are currently active with an A-League Women club.



Argentina
 Gaby Garton – Melbourne Victory – 2020–21

Brazil
 Camila – Canberra United – 2019–20
 Lais Araujo – Adelaide United – 2019–20
 Mariel Hecher – Brisbane Roar – 2020–
 Mônica – Adelaide United – 2016–17

Cameroon
 Estelle Johnson – Sydney FC – 2011–12

Canada
 Lindsay Agnew – Sydney FC – 2020
 Sasha Andrews – Perth Glory – 2012–14
 Brittany Baxter – Melbourne Victory – 2008–09
 Kennedy Faulknor – Canberra United – 2022–
 Isabella Habuda – Western Sydney Wanderers – 2021–22
 Christina Julien – Perth Glory – 2013–14
 Carmelina Moscato – Western Sydney Wanderers – 2015–16
 Leah Robinson – Adelaide United – 2008–09
 Katie Thorlakson – Melbourne Victory – 2009
 Shelina Zadorsky – Perth Glory – 2014

Chile
 María José Rojas – Canberra United – 2018, Adelaide United – 2020–21, Sydney FC – 2021–22, Melbourne City – 2022–

China
 Wu Chengshu – Canberra United – 2022–
 Xiao Yuyi – Adelaide United – 2022–23

Chinese Taipei
 Tseng Shu-o – Canberra United – 2009–11
 Lin Chiung-ying – Canberra United – 2009

Costa Rica
 Raquel Rodríguez – Perth Glory – 2017–18

Czech Republic
 Jitka Chlastáková – Western Sydney Wanderers – 2022–

Denmark
 Tine Cederkvist – Perth Glory – 2010–11
 Nina Frausing-Pedersen – Brisbane Roar – 2016–17
 Mie Leth Jans – Perth Glory – 2021–22
 Rikke Madsen – Melbourne Victory – 2022–
 Theresa Nielsen – Melbourne City – 2018–19
 Cathrine Paaske-Sørensen – Sydney FC – 2009
 Katrine Pedersen – Adelaide United – 2014–15
 Julie Rydahl Bukh – Sydney FC – 2009
 Cecilie Sandvej – Perth Glory – 2013–14

England
 Laura Bassett – Canberra United – 2017–18
 Hannah Beard – Brisbane Roar – 2012–13, Newcastle Jets – 2013–14, Western Sydney Wanderers – 2014–16
 Katy Coghlan – Perth Glory – 2008–09
 Gemma Craine – Perth Glory – 2020–22
 Natasha Dowie – Melbourne Victory – 2015–20
 Lizzie Durack – Western Sydney Wanderers – 2012–13
 Katie Holtham – Perth Glory – 2011–12, 2015–16, Adelaide United – 2014–15
 Mikaela Howell – Newcastle Jets – 2012–13
 Kristy Moore – Adelaide United – 2012–15
 Carrie Simpson – Brisbane Roar – 2015–16
 Laura Stockdale – Adelaide United – 2013–14
 Jodie Taylor – Melbourne Victory – 2010–12, Sydney FC – 2013–14, Canberra United – 2015–16, Melbourne City – 2017–19
 Carly Telford – Perth Glory – 2012–13
 Chioma Ubogagu – Brisbane Roar – 2018–19
 Fiona Worts – Adelaide United – 2020–

France
 Margot Robinne – Melbourne City – 2020–21, Canberra United – 2021–22, Brisbane Roar – 2022–

Germany
 Nadine Angerer – Brisbane Roar – 2013–15
 Ariane Hingst – Newcastle Jets – 2011–12, Canberra United – 2012–13

Ghana
 Elizabeth Addo – Western Sydney Wanderers – 2018–19

Guyana
 Sydney Cummings – Western United – 2022–

Hong Kong
 Cheung Wai Ki – Brisbane Roar – 2017–18

Iceland
 Fanndís Friðriksdóttir – Adelaide United – 2018–19
 Þóra Björg Helgadóttir – Western Sydney Wanderers – 2012–13
 Gunnhildur Yrsa Jónsdóttir – Adelaide United – 2018–19

Ireland
 Aoife Colvill – Canberra United – 2017–20
 Deborah-Anne De la Harpe – Perth Glory – 2020–22, Sydney FC 2022–
 Lillie Fenlon-Billson – Sydney FC – 2012–13
 Ciara McCormack – Newcastle Jets – 2013–14
 Denise O'Sullivan – Canberra United – 2018–19, Western Sydney Wanderers – 2019–20
 Sarah Rowe – Melbourne Victory – 2023
 Julie-Ann Russell – Western Sydney Wanderers – 2020–21

Israel
 Lee Falkon – Western Sydney Wanderers – 2017–18

Japan
 Yukari Kinga – Canberra United – 2016–17, Melbourne City – 2017–20
 Chinatsu Kira – Melbourne City – 2020–21
 Hoshimi Kishi – Brisbane Roar – 2012–13
 Rie Kitano – Brisbane Roar – 2021–22
 Yūki Nagasato – Brisbane Roar – 2018–19
 Reona Omiya – Adelaide United – 2021–22
 Nanako Sasaki – Adelaide United – 2021–
 Sachiko Tatsuoka – Brisbane Roar – 2012–13

Mexico
 Anisa Guajardo – Melbourne City – 2015–16
 Bianca Henninger – Melbourne Victory – 2016–17
 Verónica Pérez – Canberra United – 2015–16
 Arianna Romero – Perth Glory – 2016–17, 2019–20

Netherlands
 Marlous Pieëte – Western Sydney Wanderers – 2017–18
 Maruschka Waldus – Western Sydney Wanderers – 2017–19, Adelaide United – 2020–21, 2022–

New Zealand

 Lily Alfeld – Perth Glory – 2020–21
 Elizabeth Anton – Perth Glory – 2020–
 Hannah Blake – Perth Glory – 2023–
 Katie Bowen – Melbourne City – 2022–
 Hannah Bromley – Sydney FC – 2012–13, Newcastle Jets – 2015–16
 Claudia Bunge – Melbourne Victory – 2020–
 Olivia Chance – Brisbane Roar – 2020–21
 Aroon Clansey – Canberra United – 2011–12
 Katie Duncan – Melbourne Victory – 2013–14
 Abby Erceg – Adelaide United – 2011–13
 Anna Green – Adelaide United – 2011, Sydney FC – 2013–14, 2022–
 Grace Jale – Canberra United – 2022–
 Emma Kete – Perth Glory – 2011, Canberra United – 2012, 2015–16, Sydney FC – 2012–14
 Annalie Longo – Sydney FC – 2012–13, Melbourne Victory – 2019–21
 Sarah McLaughlin – Adelaide United – 2012–13
 Elizabeth Milne – Perth Glory – 2012–13, Adelaide United – 2015–16
 Marlies Oostdam – Melbourne Victory – 2008–11
 Briar Palmer – Melbourne Victory – 2015–16
 Holly Patterson – Adelaide United – 2012–13
 Emma Rolston – Sydney FC – 2017–18
 Paige Satchell – Canberra United – 2020–21, Sydney FC – 2021–22
 Rebecca Smith – Newcastle Jets – 2008–09
 Malia Steinmetz – Perth Glory – 2020–21, Western Sydney Wanderers – 2021–
 Rebekah Stott – Brisbane Roar – 2010–11, Melbourne Victory – 2011–13, Melbourne City – 2015–20, 2021–22
 Rebecca Tegg – Melbourne Victory – 2008–09
 Marisa van der Meer – Melbourne City – 2021–22
 Hannah Wilkinson – Melbourne City – 2021–
 Kirsty Yallop – Brisbane Roar – 2015–16

Nigeria
 Francisca Ordega – Sydney FC – 2016–17

Norway
 Noor Eckhoff – Melbourne City – 2021
 Marie Dølvik Markussen – Newcastle Jets – 2021–22
 Elise Thorsnes – Canberra United – 2017–18, 2019–20
 Lisa-Marie Woods – Perth Glory – 2011, Adelaide United – 2013–15

Philippines
 Sarina Bolden – Western Sydney Wanderers – 2022–
 Jaclyn Sawicki – Western United – 2022–

Scotland
 Jen Beattie – Melbourne City – 2015–16
 Rachel Corsie – Canberra United – 2018–19
 Claire Emslie – Melbourne City – 2019–20
 Kim Little – Melbourne City – 2015–16
 Louise Mason – Adelaide United – 2013–14

Serbia
 Milica Mijatović – Melbourne City – 2019–20
 Vesna Milivojević – Western Sydney Wanderers – 2019–20, Canberra United – 2022–
 Tyla-Jay Vlajnic – Melbourne City – 2015–22, Western United – 2022–

Singapore
 Lim Shiya – Perth Glory – 2008–09

South Africa
 Refiloe Jane – Canberra United – 2018–19
 Rhoda Mulaudzi – Canberra United – 2018–19

South Korea
 Jeon Ga-eul – Melbourne Victory – 2017–18

Spain
 Celia Jiménez Delgado – Perth Glory – 2019–20
 Olga Cebrian García – Brisbane Roar – 2011–12

Sweden
 Louise Fors – Western Sydney Wanderers – 2012–13
 Sanna Frostevall – Newcastle Jets – 2008–09
 Petra Larsson – Melbourne Victory – 2012–13
 Kajsa Lind – Brisbane Roar – 2022–
 Alexandra Nilsson – Perth Glory – 2010–11
 Sofie Persson – Brisbane Roar – 2015–16
 Jessica Samuelsson – Melbourne Victory – 2013

Trinidad and Tobago
 Kennya Cordner – Brisbane Roar – 2010–11

Turkey
 Gülcan Koca – Melbourne Victory – 2009–18

United States

 Murphy Agnew – Newcastle Jets – 2022–
 Morgan Andrews – Perth Glory – 2019–20
 Alex Arlitt – Western Sydney Wanderers – 2016–17
 Julia Ashley – Adelaide United – 2019–20
 Rylee Baisden – Brisbane Roar – 2019–20, Perth Glory – 2022–
 Lauren Barnes – Melbourne Victory – 2013–15, Melbourne City – 2016–20
 Hillary Beall – Western United – 2022–
 Michelle Betos – Sydney FC – 2015–16
 Aubrey Bledsoe – Sydney FC – 2017–20
 Jordyn Bloomer – Western Sydney Wanderers – 2022–23
 Tess Boade – Western Sydney Wanderers – 2022
 Tiffany Boshers – Newcastle Jets – 2012–13
 Celeste Boureille – Canberra United – 2016–17, Brisbane Roar – 2017–20
 Amber Brooks – Adelaide United – 2018–20
 Simone Charley – Canberra United – 2019–20
 Georgia Cloepfil – Melbourne Victory – 2015
 Cannon Clough – Brisbane Roar – 2021–22, Newcastle Jets – 2022–
 Danielle Colaprico – Adelaide United – 2016–18, Sydney FC – 2018–19
 Gabriella Coleman – Perth Glory – 2022–
 Shea Connors – Brisbane Roar – 2020, 2021–
 Niki Cross – Newcastle Jets – 2010–11
 Abby Dahlkemper – Adelaide United – 2015–16
 Vanessa DiBernardo – Perth Glory – 2015–17
 Makenzy Doniak – Adelaide United – 2017–18
 Caprice Dydasco – Newcastle Jets – 2015–16
 Britt Eckerstrom – Newcastle Jets – 2017–19
 Elizabeth Eddy – Newcastle Jets – 2021–22
 Emina Ekic – Melbourne City – 2022–23
 Brooke Elby – Melbourne Victory – 2015–16
 Maddy Evans – Brisbane Roar – 2016–17
 Kendall Fletcher – Central Coast Mariners – 2009, Melbourne Victory – 2010–12, Canberra United – 2013–16, 2017–18, 2020–21, Western Sydney Wanderers – 2016–17
 Amanda Frisbie – Perth Glory – 2017–18
 Emily Garnier – Newcastle Jets – 2022–
 Christina Gibbons – Melbourne Victory – 2017–18
 Shawna Gordon – Western Sydney Wanderers – 2013–14
 Sarah Griffith – Newcastle Jets – 2022–23
 Julia Grosso – Melbourne City – 2022–
 Ashleigh Gunning – Adelaide United – 2010–12
 Madison Haley – Sydney FC – 2022–
 Kristen Hamilton – Western Sydney Wanderers – 2019–20
 Hensley Hancuff – Brisbane Roar – 2022–
 Haley Hanson – Melbourne Victory – 2019–20
 Ally Haran – Canberra United – 2021–22
 Ashley Hatch – Melbourne City – 2017–18
 Taryn Hemmings – Canberra United – 2011–12
 Brooke Hendrix – Melbourne Victory – 2022
 Rachel Hill – Perth Glory – 2017–19
 Cyera Hintzen – Perth Glory – 2022–
 Jen Hoy – Newcastle Jets – 2016–17
 Sofia Huerta – Adelaide United – 2016–17, Sydney FC – 2018–20
 Tori Huster – Newcastle Jets – 2012–13, 2014, 2017–18 Western Sydney Wanderers – 2013–14
 Darian Jenkins – Melbourne Victory – 2019–20
 Danielle Johnson – Melbourne Victory – 2011–13
 Kendall Johnson – Western Sydney Wanderers – 2014–16
 Samantha Johnson – Sydney FC – 2014, Melbourne Victory – 2016–17, 2018–19, Melbourne City – 2020–21
 Chantel Jones – Perth Glory – 2013–14, Canberra United – 2014, 2021
 Hannah Keane – Western United – 2022–
 Sarah Killion – Adelaide United – 2015–16
 Haley Kopmeyer – Brisbane Roar – 2015–16, Canberra United – 2017–18
 Kaleigh Kurtz – Canberra United – 2019–20
 Lo'eau LaBonta – Western Sydney Wanderers – 2017–19
 Veronica Latsko – Adelaide United – 2018–19, Sydney FC – 2019–20
 Camille Levin – Western Sydney Wanderers – 2013–14
 Lori Lindsey – Canberra United – 2013–15
 Allison Lipsher – Newcastle Jets – 2010–11, Sydney FC – 2011–12
 Jillian Loyden – Central Coast Mariners – 2009
 Hailie Mace – Melbourne City – 2019
 Alyssa Mautz – Perth Glory – 2016–17, 2018–19, Adelaide United – 2017–18
 Savannah McCaskill – Sydney FC – 2018–19
 Jessica McDonald – Melbourne Victory – 2012–13, Western United – 2022–23
 Kristen McNabb – Melbourne Victory – 2017–18
 Emily Menges – Melbourne Victory – 2019–20
 Kristie Mewis – Canberra United – 2012–13
 Sydney Miramontez – Western Sydney Wanderers – 2018–19
 Christine Nairn – Melbourne Victory – 2014–17, 2018–19
 Katie Naughton – Adelaide United – 2016–18, Perth Glory – 2018–19
 Paige Nielsen – Western Sydney Wanderers – 2016–17, Canberra United – 2018
 Stephanie Ochs – Canberra United – 2013–15, 2016–17
 Megan Oyster – Newcastle Jets – 2015–17
 Carson Pickett – Brisbane Roar – 2017–20
 Jamie Pollock – Melbourne Victory – 2015–16
 Toni Pressley – Canberra United – 2017–18
 Megan Rapinoe – Sydney FC – 2011–12
 Elli Reed – Melbourne Victory – 2014
 Katherine Reynolds – Newcastle Jets – 2014
 Katelyn Rowland – Newcastle Jets – 2016–17
 Angela Salem – Newcastle Jets – 2012–13, 2014
 Kaitlyn Savage – Perth Glory – 2012–13, Adelaide United – 2015–16
 Kayla Sharples – Adelaide United – 2021–22
 Alex Singer – Perth Glory – 2009–11
 Julianne Sitch – Melbourne Victory – 2009
 Abby Smith – Western Sydney Wanderers – 2019–20
 Taylor Smith – Newcastle Jets – 2018–19
 Emily Sonnett – Sydney FC – 2017–18
 Jasmyne Spencer – Sydney FC – 2014–16, Canberra United – 2016–17, Melbourne City – 2018–19
 Sam Staab – Western Sydney Wanderers – 2019–20
 Nikki Stanton – Perth Glory – 2015–19
 Katie Stengel – Western Sydney Wanderers – 2016–17, Newcastle Jets – 2017–19, Canberra United – 2019–20
 Crystal Thomas – Perth Glory – 2019–20
 Erika Tymrak – Melbourne City – 2016–17
 Lydia Vandenbergh – Central Coast Mariners – 2009, Sydney FC – 2011
 Chelsee Washington – Canberra United – 2021–22
 Nikki Washington – Canberra United – 2012–13
 Ally Watt – Melbourne City – 2020
 Dani Weatherholt – Melbourne Victory – 2018–19
 Mallory Weber – Adelaide United – 2019–21
 Lynn Williams – Western Sydney Wanderers – 2019–20, Melbourne Victory – 2021–22
 Keelin Winters – Western Sydney Wanderers – 2014–16
 Arin Wright – Newcastle Jets – 2016–19
 Kelsey Wys – Newcastle Jets – 2016–17
 Beverly Yanez – Melbourne City – 2016–17
 Catherine Zimmerman – Melbourne Victory – 2020–

Wales
 Jess Fishlock – Melbourne Victory – 2012–14, Melbourne City – 2015–18
 Carys Hawkins – Perth Glory – 2008–14

See also

W-League records and statistics

Notes

References
General

 
Australia
 
Association football player non-biographical articles
Lists of women's association football players